Marios Sakellariou (Greek: Μάριος Σακελλαρίου; born June 21, 1992) is a Greek professional basketball player for Kymis of the Greek Basket League. He is 2.02 m (6 ft 7.5 in) tall. He plays at the small forward and power forward positions.

Professional career
Born in Katerini, Sakellariou started playing basketball with Pierikos Archelaos, where he stayed until 2014. He then moved to Iraklio, and the next season, he moved to Psychiko of the Greek A2 League. With Psychiko, he played for two seasons, being a role player for the team.

On September 19, 2017, Sakellariou joined Kymis of the Greek Basket League.

References

External links
Sfera Sports Association Profile
Eurobasket.com Profile
Greek Basket League Profile 

1992 births
Living people
Greek men's basketball players
Greek Basket League players
Irakleio B.C. players
Kymis B.C. players
Small forwards
Psychiko B.C. players
Sportspeople from Katerini